DeForest Covan (September 9, 1917 - September 8, 2007) was an American actor, dancer, and former black vaudeville performer. From his first film appearance in 1936, in The Singing Kid, his acting career stretched to the 1990s.  In early 1978, he appeared in two episodes of the TV series, Good Times. First, as Reverend Beasley in the episode, "Something Old, Something New", and again as the character, Shorty, in the episode titled, "Write On, Thelma". Other appearances included Martin (1993) and NYPD Blue (1993).

Partial filmography

The Singing Kid (1936) - Dancer (uncredited)
Nancy Steele Is Missing! (1937) - Little Bill (uncredited)
A Day at the Races (1937) - Black Singer (uncredited)
Every Day's a Holiday (1937) - Dancer (uncredited)
Too Hot to Handle (1938) - South American Fire Dancer (uncredited)
Going Places (1938) - Shoe-Shine (uncredited)
Boy Slaves (1939) - Pinkie (uncredited)
St. Louis Blues (1939) - Dancer (uncredited)
Pride of the Blue Grass (1939) - Blackie (uncredited)
Chasing Trouble (1940) - Jackson (uncredited)
New Moon (1940) - Dancer (uncredited)
South of Suez (1940) - Bita (uncredited)
Mr. Washington Goes to Town (1941) - Short Man
Jungle Drums of Africa (1953) - Native Tribesman (uncredited)
Carmen Jones (1954) - Trainer (uncredited)
Panther Girl of the Kongo (1955) - Koango (uncredited)
Pork Chop Hill (1959) - U.S. Soldier (uncredited)
Black Samson (1974) - Samson's Street People
The Day of the Locust (1975) - Shoe Shine Boy
Rocky (1976) - Apollo's Corner #1
New York, New York (1977) - Porter 
The Incredible Melting Man (1977) - Janitor
Beneath the Valley of the Ultra-Vixens (1979) - Zebulon
When a Stranger Calls (1979) - Officer #1
Cheech and Chong's Next Movie (1980) - Pinochle Player
Evilspeak (1981) - Janitor
Body and Soul (1981) - Cut Man
Honkytonk Man (1982) - Gravedigger
The Night Before (1988) - Concierge 
To Sleep with Anger (1990) - Fred Jenkins
One Good Cop (1991) - Older Man

References

External links

1917 births
2007 deaths
Male actors from Chicago
American male film actors
African-American male actors
American male television actors
20th-century American male actors
20th-century African-American people
21st-century African-American people